The Ministry of Posts and Telecommunications is the government ministry that governs the postal system and the telecommunications systems of Cambodia. The ministry maintains offices in Phnom Penh.

Telecom Cambodia  and Camnet Internet Service, the country's principal telecom operator and internet service provider, function under the jurisdiction of the Ministry.

The main office is situated at the former site of the Roman Catholic Cathedral of Phnom Penh, destroyed by the Khmer Rouge in 1975.*1321# information technology bonahun,

Departments
Administrative departments of the Ministry include:
Posts Department
International Telecom Department
Domestic Telecom Department
Inspection Department
Finance and Plan Department
Frequency Management and Licensing Department

See also
Communications in Cambodia
Government of Cambodia
SEATEL Cambodia

References

External links
Ministry of Posts and Telecommunications
Telecom Cambodia

Communications in Cambodia
Government ministries of Cambodia
Cambodia
Phnom Penh